Aleksandr Geirot was a Soviet male actor and painter. Honored Artist of the RSFSR.

Selected filmography 
 1916 — Dikaya sila
 1925 — The Marriage of the Bear
 1930 — St. Jorgen's Day

References

External links 
 Александр Гейрот on kino-teatr.ru

Soviet male film actors
1882 births
1947 deaths